Fernando Ariel Maldonado (born 25 May 1992) is an Argentine professional footballer who plays as a forward.

Career
Maldonado's career started with Argentino. He appeared in the 2012–13 Primera C Metropolitana for the club, though would subsequently spend 2013–14 in Primera D Metropolitana on loan with Muñiz. Seven goals in thirty-two appearances followed. Maldonado returned to Argentino in 2014, remaining for five further seasons in the fourth tier to take his overall tally to one hundred and nine matches and twenty-four goals; with his penultimate season ending with relegation. On 30 June 2018, Maldonado joined Comunicaciones of Primera B Metropolitana. He made his debut against Deportivo Riestra on 18 August.

Career statistics
.

References

External links

1992 births
Living people
Place of birth missing (living people)
Argentine footballers
Argentine expatriate footballers
Association football forwards
Primera C Metropolitana players
Primera D Metropolitana players
Primera B Metropolitana players
Argentino de Merlo footballers
Club Social y Deportivo Muñiz footballers
Club Comunicaciones footballers
Boston River players
Club Atlético Atlas footballers
Argentine expatriate sportspeople in Uruguay
Expatriate footballers in Uruguay